The 2021–22 Southside Flyers season is the 30th season for the franchise in the Women's National Basketball League (WNBL).

Roster

Standings

Results

Regular season

Notes
 Southside's Round 11 game against the Canberra Capitals was a loss by forfeit.

References

External links
Southside Flyers Official website

2021–22 WNBL season
WNBL seasons by team
Basketball,Southside Flyers
2021 in basketball
2021 in women's basketball
2021–22 in Australian basketball